Damaromyia is a genus of flies in the family Stratiomyidae.

Species
Damaromyia bifossa Hardy, 1931
Damaromyia clivosa Hardy, 1931
Damaromyia confusa Hardy, 1931
Damaromyia depressa Hardy, 1931
Damaromyia discolor Hardy, 1931
Damaromyia hirsuta Hardy, 1931
Damaromyia interrupta James, 1950
Damaromyia limbipuncta Hardy, 1931
Damaromyia neohirsuta Hardy, 1939
Damaromyia nitens (Hardy, 1922)
Damaromyia racemipuncta Hardy, 1931
Damaromyia similis Hardy, 1939
Damaromyia tasmanica Kertész, 1916
Damaromyia trina Hardy, 1931
Damaromyia whitei (Hardy, 1920)

References

Stratiomyidae
Brachycera genera
Taxa named by Kálmán Kertész
Diptera of Australasia